Hexage is a Czech video game developer, based in Mníšek pod Brdy and registered in the United Kingdom. The company has produced multiple titles for mobile devices. A few of studio's games have surpassed a million downloads. The most successful title is Reaper: Tale of a Pale Swordsman.

The company was founded in 2009. It originally focused on mobile devices but in 2013 the company released its games for Windows. Reaper: Tale of a Pale Swordsman even became available on Steam as it succeeded on Steam Greenlight. The company also tried to release Radiant Defense on Steam before, and it got released as well.

Even though the company is based in the Czech Republic, it built an image of British company, since in 2009 it was impossible to release video games from the Czech Republic on Google Play. The company develops its games with its own devices. The soundtracks for all the games are by Kubatko.

Games

References

Video game companies of the Czech Republic
Mobile game companies
Video game development companies
Video game companies established in 2009
Czech companies established in 2009